Last Battle may refer to:

 The Last Battle, a 1956 novel by C. S. Lewis
 The Last Battle (band), Scottish alternative indie folk band
 The Last Battle (Ryan), a 1966 book about the Battle of Berlin in World War II by Cornelius Ryan
 The Last Battle (Harding), a 2013 book about the Battle for Castle Itter in World War II by Stephen Harding
 Last Battle (video game), a 1989 Sega video game
 Armageddon, in Christian theology, the final battle between God and Satan
 The Last Battle (Middle-earth), or Dagor Dagorath, in J. R. R. Tolkien's Middle-earth legendarium
 Le Dernier Combat (English title: The Last Battle), a 1983 French film directed by Luc Besson
 The Last Battle (1923 film), a German silent film
 Tarmon Gai'don, or the Last Battle, an event in The Wheel of Time series by Robert Jordan